Lawin may refer to:

 Ławin, settlement in the administrative district of Gmina Nowogródek Pomorski
 Lawin, Perak, settlement in Hulu Perak District, Perak, Malaysia